Jaro Medien GmbH (Jaro Media) is a German music company founded in 1981. It books eclectic musical acts, as well as publishing and selling recordings.

Artists
 Aquabella
 Arkady Shilkloper
 Betagarri
 Bremen Immigrant Orchestra
 Charles (Wuppertal)
 Charles Petersohn meets Jasper van't Hof
 Christian Kaiser
 Crash (Warsaw)
 Dona Rosa
 Farlanders
 Georgi Petrov
 Grace Yoon/Roman Bunka
 Hamlet Gonashvili
 Hannes Beckmann
 hartkamp
 Huun-Huur-Tu
 International Skoda Band
 Ivan Opium
 Jasper van't Hof (Piano solo)
 Jasper van't Hof HotLips
 Jasper van't Hof Quartett
 Jasper van't Hof's Pili-Pili
 Joachim-Ernst Berendt
 Johannes Cernota
 Johannes Cernota/Constanze Brüning
 Kayoko
 Toshinori Kondo
 La Voce
 Les Anges Compagnie
 Luis Di Matteo
 Mari Boine/Inna Zhelannaya/Sergey Starostin
 Meta Four
 Mikhail Alperin
 Moscow Art Trio
 müller (Hannover)
 Nusrath Fateh Ali Khan
 Okay Temiz Magnetic Band
 Oriental Wind/Okay Temiz
 Payuta
 Piirpauke
 Sarband
 Sergey Starostin's Vocal Family
 Julian Spizz
 Tam Echo Tam
 The Blech
 The Bulgarian Voices - Angelite
 The Shin
 Thomas Beckmann
 Thomas Beckmann/Johannes Cernota
 Trigon
 Trinovox
 Vladiswar Nadishana
 Warsaw Village Band
 Weitere Künstler
 Willy Schwarz

See also
 List of record labels

External links
official site

German independent record labels
Record labels established in 1981
1981 establishments in Germany